Rachael Darragh (born 24 September 1997) is an Irish badminton player who trained at the Raphoe badminton club. She won the girls' singles bronze medal at the 2012 UK School Games held in London. At the same year, she became the runner-up of 2012 Fyffes Irish Future Series in the women's doubles event with her partner Alannah Stephenson. Darragh competed at the 2015 Baku and 2019 Minsk European Games, also represented Northern Ireland at the 2018 Commonwealth Games in Gold Coast, Australia.

Darragh graduated from the Raphoe Royal and Prior Comprehensive School, and educated leisure management at Dublin Institute of Technology.

Achievements

BWF International Challenge/Series (3 runners-up) 
Women's singles

Women's doubles

  BWF International Challenge tournament
  BWF International Series tournament
  BWF Future Series tournament

References

External links 
 

1998 births
Living people
People from Letterkenny
Sportspeople from County Donegal
Irish female badminton players
Badminton players at the 2015 European Games
Badminton players at the 2019 European Games
European Games competitors for Ireland
Badminton players at the 2018 Commonwealth Games
Badminton players at the 2022 Commonwealth Games
Commonwealth Games competitors for Northern Ireland
People educated at the Royal and Prior School